"Switch" is a 1997 song by Howie B. It made #62 on the UK Singles Chart. A music video for the song, directed by Run Wrake, was produced.

References

1997 singles
1997 songs
Polydor Records singles